Amashiyeh or Ammashiyeh or Amasheyeh may refer to:
 Amashiyeh-ye Yek
 Amashiyeh-ye Do